"The Big Parade" is the first episode of the fourth series of the British comedy series Dad's Army. It was originally transmitted on Friday 25 September 1970.

Synopsis
Captain Mainwaring has doubts about letting Private Walker supply the platoon's mascot for the big 'Spitfire Week' parade.

Plot
After watching a film, Mainwaring and Wilson notice, on the newsreel, Winston Churchill admiring a Czech regiment, and their regimental mascot, a ram. This gives Mainwaring an idea. He tries to tell Wilson, who is more interested in trying to kiss Mrs Pike, and Jones, who is in a passionate embrace with Mrs Fox. However, he is interrupted by the air raid siren.

The following evening, Mainwaring mentions a big parade of all civil defence units, and believes that they should have a mascot on the parade. Many ideas are suggested, including a live painted lady, a white mouse and a large domestic cat. It is Wilson who comes up trumps by suggesting that they have a ram as well. Frazer remarks that Pte. Sponge is a sheep farmer. Sponge grants Mainwaring permission to catch one if they can. Hodges enters, and he and Mainwaring argue as to who should lead the procession.

A few days later, Mainwaring and Wilson take Jones' section to Sponge's farm to catch the ram. Jones' section attempt to creep up on the ram, but as they try to grab it, it runs away. The platoon give chase, until it vanishes. Mainwaring sends Pike to look for it. He hears the ram bleating, and runs through a bush. Suddenly, he screams, and a sloshing sound is heard.

Whilst in his search for the ram, Wilson discovers Pike stuck in a muddy bog, and sinking rapidly. Wilson attempts to reach him, but gets caught on some barbed wire. They call to the rest of the platoon, who eventually find them. Much to Wilson's annoyance, Mainwaring declares that Pike's predicament should take top priority. They remove their shirts and trousers and lay them down on top of the bog, with Sponge lying on top of the clothes. Lying down on top of Sponge, Mainwaring is able to lean across the bog and pull Pike out.

Frazer notices that Jones is missing. Godfrey is shocked to see Jones' forage cap resting on top of the bog. Sponge lays down again, and Frazer attempts to feel for Jones, with no success. The platoon are saddened, until they see Jones returning with a rope to rescue Pike. Whilst marching back, Hodges watches with glee as the muddy platoon trudge by, but is frustrated that he can't think of any insult to offer them.

As the parade approaches, Walker suggests another method. He shows Mainwaring a picture of a magnificent ram, but turns up with a mangy, moth-eaten goat with hardly a scrap of wool on him! Mainwaring angrily retrieves his £5 note, which is promptly eaten by the goat. It is decided that they will march without a mascot.

The parade is forming, and Hodges is still under the impression that his Wardens are leading the parade, so he is shocked when Mainwaring's platoon form up in front of him. Mainwaring signals the Verger, who is Skipper of the Sea Scouts' band, to lead off. As they march off, Hodges' Wardens attempt to overtake the platoon, and it turns into a marching race through Walmington.

Cast

Arthur Lowe as Captain Mainwaring
John Le Mesurier as Sergeant Wilson
Clive Dunn as Lance Corporal Jones
John Laurie as Private Frazer
James Beck as Private Walker
Arnold Ridley as Private Godfrey
Ian Lavender as Private Pike
Bill Pertwee as ARP Warden Hodges
Edward Sinclair as The Verger
Janet Davies as Mrs Pike
Pamela Cundell as Mrs Fox
Colin Bean as Private Sponge

Notes
When Hodges leaves the church hall after his argument with Mainwaring, the platoon insult him by whistling the Laurel and Hardy theme tune when he walks.
The Teddy Bears' Picnic is being played when the Home Guard struggle to catch the ram.
Just before Jones' section attempt to grab the ram, Pike makes a reference to the film The Last of the Mohicans (1938), by sticking grass in his forage cap.
The episode title takes its name from the silent era classic film The Big Parade (1925).
In this episode it is revealed by the Verger, Mr Yeatman, that the Vicar once worked as a missionary.
The Sea Scout band featured in "The Big Parade" was the 5th St. Mary's Sea Scouts from Great Yarmouth. All of their uniforms were debadged, then rebadged with Warmington on Sea and genuine merit badges of the day. The BBC went into great detail over the uniforms and apparel of the day. Some of the extras had to wear WW2 style glasses and all had Melton shorts with knee length socks.

Further reading

External links

Dad's Army (series 4) episodes
1970 British television episodes